Chionanthus sabahensis grows as a tree up to  tall, with a trunk diameter of up to . The bark is green. The flowers are greenish white. C. sabahensis is endemic to Borneo where it is confined to Sabah.

References

sabahensis
Endemic flora of Borneo
Trees of Borneo
Flora of Sabah
Plants described in 2002